Megaerops is a genus of megabat.

It includes the following species:
Tailless fruit bat (Megaerops ecaudatus)
Javan tailless fruit bat (Megaerops kusnotoi)
Ratanaworabhan's fruit bat (Megaerops niphanae)
White-collared fruit bat (Megaerops wetmorei)

References

 
Bat genera
Taxa named by Wilhelm Peters